Stigmatodactylus is a genus of flowering plants from the orchid family, Orchidaceae. It has thirteen currently recognized species (as of November 2016), native to China, Taiwan, Japan, the Himalayas, the Philippines,  Malaysia, Indonesia, New Guinea and the Solomon Islands.

Species list
The following is a list of accepted species of Stigmatodactylus accepted by Plants of the World Online as at February 2021:
 Stigmatodactylus aegeridantennatus (N.Hallé) M.A.Clem. & D.L.Jones - New Caledonia
 Stigmatodactylus aquamarinus A.S.Rob. & Gironella - Palawan (Philippines)
 Stigmatodactylus bracteatus (Rendle) M.A.Clem. & D.L.Jones - New Caledonia
 Stigmatodactylus celebicus Schltr. - Sulawesi
 Stigmatodactylus confusus (Guillaumin) M.A.Clem. & D.L.Jones - New Caledonia
 Stigmatodactylus croftianus (Kores) Kores - New Guinea
 Stigmatodactylus cymbalariifolius (F.Muell. & Kraenzl.) M.A.Clem. & D.L.Jones - New Caledonia
 Stigmatodactylus dalagangpalawanicum A.S.Rob. - Palawan (Philippines)
 Stigmatodactylus elegans (Rchb.f.) M.A.Clem. & D.L.Jones - New Caledonia
 Stigmatodactylus gibbsiae (Kores) Kores - New Guinea
 Stigmatodactylus grandiflorus (Schltr.) M.A.Clem. & D.L.Jones - New Caledonia
 Stigmatodactylus halleanus (Kores) M.A.Clem. & D.L.Jones - New Caledonia
 Stigmatodactylus heptadactylus (Kraenzl.) M.A.Clem. & D.L.Jones - New Caledonia
 Stigmatodactylus javanicus Schltr. & J.J.Sm. - Java
 Stigmatodactylus lamrii (J.J.Wood & C.L.Chan) D.L.Jones & M.A.Clem. - Sabah
 Stigmatodactylus macroglossus (Schltr.) M.A.Clem. & D.L.Jones - New Caledonia
 Stigmatodactylus oxyglossus (Schltr.) M.A.Clem. & D.L.Jones - New Caledonia
 Stigmatodactylus paradoxus (Prain) Schltr. - Sikkim
 Stigmatodactylus richardianus P.T.Ong - Peninsular Malaysia
 Stigmatodactylus serratus (Deori) A.N.Rao - Assam
 Stigmatodactylus sikokianus Maxim. ex Makino - Fujian, Hunan, Taiwan, Japan
 Stigmatodactylus tenuilabris (Schltr.) M.A.Clem. & D.L.Jones - New Caledonia
 Stigmatodactylus variegatus (Kores) Kores - New Guinea
 Stigmatodactylus veillonis (N.Hallé) M.A.Clem. & D.L.Jones - New Caledonia
 Stigmatodactylus vulcanicus (Schodde) Maek. - Solomon Islands

See also
List of Orchidaceae genera

References

Berg Pana, H. 2005. Handbuch der Orchideen-Namen. Dictionary of Orchid Names. Dizionario dei nomi delle orchidee. Ulmer, Stuttgart

Diurideae genera
Acianthinae